Aimo Cajander's third cabinet was the 22nd government of Republic of Finland. Cabinet's time period was from March 12, 1937 to December 1, 1939. It was Majority government.

References 

Cajander, 3
1937 establishments in Finland
1939 disestablishments in Finland
Cabinets established in 1937
Cabinets disestablished in 1939